Alexander is an unincorporated community in Morgan County, Illinois, United States.

History
Alexander was laid out in the 1850s by John T. Alexander, and named for him. A post office has been in operation at Alexander since 1857.

Demographics

References

Unincorporated communities in Morgan County, Illinois
Unincorporated communities in Illinois
1857 establishments in Illinois
Populated places established in 1857